The 1966–67 West Midlands (Regional) League season was the 67th in the history of the West Midlands (Regional) League, an English association football competition for semi-professional and amateur teams based in the West Midlands county, Shropshire, Herefordshire, Worcestershire and southern Staffordshire.

Premier Division

The Premier Division featured 19 clubs which competed in the division last season, along with three new clubs:
Boston United, transferred from the United Counties League
Coventry City "A"
Shrewsbury Town reserves

League table

References

External links

1966–67
W